Takigawa (written: 滝川, 瀧川,  or 多岐川) is a Japanese surname. Notable people with the surname include:

 Takigawa Kazumasu (1525–1586), Sengoku period samurai retainer
 Christel Takigawa (born 1977), Japanese television announcer and news presenter
 Eiji Takigawa (born 1979), Japanese actor, singer, and entertainer
 Yumi Takigawa (born 1951), Japanese actress and singer

See also
 alternate spelling of Takikawa, Hokkaidō, Japanese city
 Takigawa incident, an incident at Kyoto University during the 1930s

Japanese-language surnames